Tavistock Times Gazette is a weekly newspaper which serves the Tavistock area in West Devon, England. It is published in tabloid format every Thursday.

The paper exists as the result of the merging of two rival papers in 1986. The Tavistock Times, founded in 1920, competed with the older Tavistock Gazette, founded in 1857, and each at various points threatened to put the other out of business.

The paper has a circulation of about 8,000, and is owned by the Tindle Newspaper Group.

References

External links
 Tavistock Times Gazette - Official website

Publications established in 1986
Weekly newspapers published in the United Kingdom
Newspapers published in Devon
Tavistock
1857 establishments in England